HMS Helverson was formerly Hilversum of the Admiralty of Amsterdam. She was built around 1655 as a third rate frigate.

Hilversum was attacked in the Battle of Lowestoft by the fireship HMS Bramble, under Captain Napthali Ball. Hilversum was captured by other British ships as the crew of the Hilversum fought the fire.

Renamed HMS Helverson, the ship was sunk to block the River Medway from the invading Dutch fleet on 12 June 1667. The Dutch fleet was attempting to raid the docks at Chatham Dockyard. John Evelyn drew a sketch 'A scheme of the 12th of June 1667' depicting the position of HMS Helverson.  She has been the only ship of the Royal Navy to be called HMS Helverson.

References

Anglo-Dutch Wars
Frigates of the Royal Navy
1650s ships
Captured ships